The epithet "the Hermit" may be applied to:

 Anthony the Hermit (c. 468–c. 520), Christian saint
 Bluebeard the Hermit (died 1450), a leader of the English uprising generally known as Jack Cade's Rebellion
 Elias the Hermit, 4th-century ascetic saint and monk
 Eusebius the Hermit, 4th-century Eastern Orthodox saint and monk
 Felix the Hermit, 9th-century Roman Catholic saint, fisherman and hermit
 Saint Giles (c. 650–c. 710), Greek saint
 Gustav the Hermit (c. 810–890), Swedish Catholic saint
 Harry Hallowes (c. 1936–2016), Irishman famous for living on Hampstead Heath, London
 Venerable John the Hermit, 4th-century hermit and Eastern Orthodox and Eastern Catholic saint
 Juan de Ortega (hermit) (1080–1163), better known as John the Hermit, Spanish Roman Catholic priest hermit and saint
 Marcus Eremita, 5th-century Christian theologian and ascetic writer
 Matthew the Hermit, 4th century Oriental Orthodox saint
 Palladius of Antioch (died 390), saint in the Roman Empire
 Paphnutius the Ascetic, 4th-century saint and Egyptian anchorite
 Pardus the Hermit (died 6th century), Eastern Orthodox saint
 Peter the Hermit (died 1115), priest and key figure in the First Crusade
 Phosterius the Hermit, 7th-century Byzantine saint
 Thomas the Hermit, early Egyptian Coptic Orthodox saint
 Venerius the Hermit (c. 560—630), monk, hermit and Catholic saint
 Zeno the Hermit, 5th-century saint
 Zosimus the Hermit, 3rd-century saint and ascetic

See also
 Paul of Thebes (died c. 341), saint regarded as the first Christian hermit
 Peter the Hermit of Galatia, 5th-century saint
 Theodore of the Jordan, called the Hermit of the Jordan, 6th-century hermit and Eastern Orthodox saint
 Christopher Thomas Knight, called the Hermit of the North Pond, 21st-century hermit

Lists of people by epithet